Ilgwang Station is a railway station of the Donghae Line in Ilgwang-myeon, Gijang County, Busan, South Korea.

Station Layout

References

Gijang County
Korail stations
Railway stations in Busan
Railway stations opened in 1934
1934 establishments in Korea